Winter Story 2004–2005 is a compilation album by Korean musical group Shinhwa.  It was released on December 20, 2004, making it the group's second Winter Story album.  The album met with same success as the other albums released by Shinhwa.  Their single, "How Do I Say," became a hit throughout Asia.

Tracks
Information is adapted from the liner notes of Winter Story 2004–2005:

Chart performance

Release history

Personnel
Information is adapted from the liner notes of Winter Story 2004–2005:
 Song Kyeong-jo - recording engineer
 Kwon Jeong-shin - recording engineer
 Song Yong-deok - recording engineer
 Jeong Eun-kyeong - recording engineer
 Kim Min-ee - recording engineer
 Heo Eun-sook - recording engineer
 Na In-kyu - recording engineer
 Kim Han-gu - mixing engineer
 Park Hyeok - mixing engineer
 Kim Young-seong - mixing engineer
 Choi Hyo-young - mastering engineer
 Sam Lee - guitar
 Lee Seong-ryeol - guitar
 Lee Tae-woon - bass
 Heo Jae-hyeok - bass
 Im Seung-beom - keyboard
 Kim Dong-ha - trumpet

References

Shinhwa albums
2004 compilation albums